Inversion therapy, or simply inversion, is the process of seeking therapeutic benefits from hanging by the legs, ankles, or feet in an inverted angle or entirely upside down.  It is a form of spinal traction.  Gravity boots are ankle supports designed for inversion therapy. Some people use gravity boots to add an extra challenge to workouts, doing inverted crunches or squats.

People who have heart disease, high blood pressure, eye diseases (such as glaucoma), or are pregnant are at higher risk for the dangers related to inversion therapy and should consult their doctors about it first. The first time anyone tries inversion therapy with gravity, they should be sure to have someone standing by, in case assistance is required to get out of the apparatus, or if health problems are experienced.

During an episode of acid reflux, small amounts of stomach acid may manage to escape from the stomach and into the oesophagus. Gravity typically minimizes this upward leakage, but an inversion table and acid reflux can be a painful, nauseating, and potentially dangerous combination. The inverted position, leading to an increase in heart rate and output, peripheral resistance, venous return and myocardial oxygen consumption, is not recommended in cardiac individuals.

Additional images

References 

Exercise equipment
Physical therapy